Ultralight aviation (called microlight aviation in some countries) is the flying of lightweight, 1- or 2-seat fixed-wing aircraft. Some countries differentiate between weight-shift control and conventional three-axis control aircraft with ailerons, elevator and rudder, calling the former "microlight" and the latter "ultralight".

During the late 1970s and early 1980s, mostly stimulated by the hang gliding movement, many people sought affordable powered flight. As a result, many aviation authorities set up definitions of lightweight, slow-flying aeroplanes that could be subject to minimum regulations. The resulting aeroplanes are commonly called "ultralight aircraft" or "microlights", although the weight and speed limits differ from country to country. The definition means that the aircraft has a slow landing speed and short landing roll in the event of an engine failure.

In most affluent countries, microlights or ultralight aircraft now account for a significant percentage of the global civilian-owned aircraft. For instance in Canada in February 2018, the ultralight aircraft fleet made up to 20.4% of the total civilian aircraft registered. In other countries that do not register ultralight aircraft, like the United States, it is unknown what proportion of the total fleet they make up. In countries where there is no specific extra regulation, ultralights are considered regular aircraft and subject to certification requirements for both aircraft and pilot.

Definitions

Australia
In Australia, ultralight aircraft and their pilots can either be registered with the Hang Gliding Federation of Australia (HGFA) or Recreational Aviation Australia (RA Aus). In all cases, except for privately built single seat ultralight aeroplanes, microlight aircraft or trikes are regulated by the Civil Aviation Regulations.

Canada

United Kingdom

For heavier microlights the current UK regulations are similar to the European ones, but helicopters and gyroplanes are not included.

Other than the very earliest aircraft, all two-seat UK microlights (and until 2007 all single-seaters) have been required to meet an airworthiness standard; BCAR Section S.
In 2007, Single Seat DeRegulated (SSDR), a sub-category of single seat aircraft was introduced, allowing owners more freedom for modification and experiments. By 2017 the airworthiness of all single seat microlights became solely the responsibility of the user, but pilots must hold a microlight licence; currently NPPL(M) (National Private Pilots Licence).

New Zealand
Ultralights in New Zealand are subject to NZCAA General Aviation regulations with microlight specific variations as described in Part 103 and AC103-1.

United States

The United States FAA's definition of an ultralight is significantly different from that in most other countries and can lead to some confusion when discussing the topic. The governing regulation in the United States is FAR 103 Ultralight Vehicles. In 2004, the FAA introduced the "Light-sport aircraft" category, which resembles some other countries' microlight categories. Ultralight aviation is represented by the United States Ultralight Association (USUA), which acts as the US aeroclub representative to the Fédération Aéronautique Internationale.

Types
There are several categories of aircraft which qualify as ultralights in some countries:
 Fixed-wing aircraft: traditional airplane-style designs.
 Weight-shift control trike: use a hang glider-style wing, below which is suspended a three-wheeled carriage which carries the engine and aviators. These aircraft are controlled by pushing against a horizontal control bar in roughly the same way as a hang glider pilot flies.
 Powered parachute: fuselage-mounted engines with parafoil wings, which are wheeled aircraft.
 Powered paraglider: backpack engines with parafoil wings, which are foot-launched.
 Powered hang glider: motorized foot-launched hang glider harness.
 Autogyro: rotary wing with fuselage-mounted engine, a gyrocopter is different from a helicopter in that the rotating wing is not powered, the engine provides forward thrust and the airflow through the rotary blades causes them to autorotate or "spin up" thereby creating lift.
 Helicopter: there are a number of single-seat and two-place helicopters which fall under the microlight categories in countries such as New Zealand.  However, few helicopter designs fall within the more restrictive ultralight category defined in the United States of America. 
 Hot air balloon: there are numerous ultralight hot air balloons in the US, and several more have been built and flown in France and Australia in recent years. Some ultralight hot air balloons are hopper balloons, while others are regular hot air balloons that carry passengers in a basket.

Electric
Advancements in batteries, motors, and motor controllers has led to some practical production electric propulsion systems for some ultralight applications. In many ways, ultralights are a good application for electric power as some models are capable of flying with low power, which allows longer duration flights on battery power.

In 2007, the first pioneering company in this field, the Electric Aircraft Corporation, began offering engine kits to convert ultralight weight shift trikes to electric power. The 18 hp motor weighs  and an efficiency of 90% is claimed by designer Randall Fishman. The battery consists of a lithium-polymer battery pack of 5.6kWh which provides 1.5 hours of flying in the trike application. The company claimed a flight recharge cost of 60 cents in 2007.

A significant obstacle to the adoption of electric propulsion for ultralights in the U.S. is the weight of the battery, which is considered part of the empty weight of the aircraft despite efforts to have it considered as fuel. As battery energy density improves lighter batteries can be used.

See also
 Aerosport (airshow)
 Backpack helicopter
 Jetpack
 Nanolight
 Experimental Aircraft Association
 Recreational Aviation Australia
 United States Ultralight Association
 United States Powered Paragliding Association
 Volksflugzeug

References

External links

 
Air sports